Émigrés' billions (loi sur le milliard des émigrés or act of the billion emigrants) refers to the French law that granted one billion francs to the French aristocrats who fled France during the French revolution, as compensation for land redistributed in their absence.

References

Law of France
French Revolution